The Pachitea Province is one of eleven provinces of the Huánuco Region in Peru. The capital of this province is Panao.

Boundaries
North: Huánuco Province
East: Puerto Inca Province
South: Pasco Region
West: Ambo Province

Geography 
Some of the highest mountains of the province are listed below:

Political division
The province is divided into four districts, which are:

 Chaglla (Chaglla)
 Molino (Molino)
 Panao (Panao)
 Umari (Umari)

Ethnic groups 
The province is inhabited by indigenous citizens of Quechua descent. Spanish, however, is the language which the majority of the population (52.69%) learnt to speak in childhood, 46.98% of the residents started speaking using the Quechua language (2007 Peru Census).

See also 
 Usnu

Sources 

Provinces of the Huánuco Region